Joni Mitchell Archives – Vol. 2: The Reprise Years (1968–1971) is a five-disc box set by Canadian singer-songwriter Joni Mitchell, released on November 12, 2021, by Rhino Records. The box set is the seventh overall release and second offering of unreleased material from the Joni Mitchell Archives, a planned series of releases containing remastered material from the singer's personal archives. Formatted in chronological order, the second volume of the series includes archived material that was recorded in the years between the release of Mitchell's debut studio album, Song to a Seagull (1968) and her fourth studio album, Blue (1971).

Background and recording
On September 10, 2020, Rhino Records announced the creation of the Joni Mitchell Archives, a planned years-long effort by Mitchell and her late manager Elliot Roberts to finally release and remaster previously unreleased recordings in Mitchell's archives. The first round of releases featured a box set of previously unreleased material (Joni Mitchell Archives – Vol. 1: The Early Years (1963–1967)), a condensed version subtitled Highlights, an auxiliary compilation album of the earliest material in the box set (Early Joni – 1963), and a separate release of the live sets featured on the box's last two discs (Live at Canterbury House – 1967). The press release announcing the archive's creation indicated a similar release structure would be followed on a yearly basis, which each release round moving through Mitchell's career in chronological order. On April 8, 2021, Rhino announced Joni Mitchell Archives – Vol. 2: The Reprise Years (1968–1971) was scheduled to be released in October of that year (the box set was later pushed back to November 12). An alteration to the yearly release schedule was also announced in the press release; releasing earlier that same year would be a box set of remastered albums titled The Reprise Albums (1968–1971), and all "future releases in the archive series will arrive in a similar manner, with a box set focused on studio albums from a specific era, followed by an official 'Archives' release looking at unreleased audio from the same period."

Critical reception

Upon release, Joni Mitchell Archives – Vol. 2: The Reprise Years (1968–1971) received critical acclaim from music critics. At Metacritic, which assigns a normalized rating out of 100 to reviews from mainstream critics, the album has an average score of 92 based on 7 reviews, indicating "universal acclaim".

Track listing
All tracks are written by Joni Mitchell, except where noted.

Disc 1

Disc 2

Disc 3

Disc 4

Disc 5

Personnel
Credits adapted from Discogs.

Performers
 Joni Mitchell – vocals (all tracks); guitar; bass
 Terresa Adams – cello (4/17)
 Don Bagley – cello arrangement (4/17)
 Kenny Baldock – bass (2/29, 2/33)
 John Cameron – harpsichord (2/29, 2/33); piano (2/29, 2/33)
 Tony Carr – drums (2/29, 2/33)
 Dave Cousins – guitar (2/29, 2/33)
 Jim Horn – recorder (4/18)
 Myra Kestenbaum – viola (5/24–5/26)
 Russ Kunkel – drums; percussion (5/24–5/26)
 Edgar Lustgarten – cello (5/24–5/26)
 Harold McNair – flute (2/29, 2/33)
 Willie Ruff – cello (5/24–5/26)
 Sheldon Sanov – violin (5/24–5/26)
 Paul Shure – violin (5/24–5/26)

Production and recording
 Bernie Andrews – recording (2/28–2/23)
 Art Chryst – recording (1/10–1/13)
 Tony Converse – producer (4/8–4/12)
 Bernie Grundman – mastering
 John Etchells – recording (5/1–5/23)
 Michael Graves – audio restoration
 Jeff Griffin – producer (5/1–5/23)
 Jimi Hendrix – recording (2/1–2/23)
 Stanley Johnston – mixing (2/24)
 Morley Lang – recording (4/8–4/12)
 Henry Lewy – mixing (4/3–4/5, 4/13, 4/17–4/18, 4/20–4/21, 5/24–5/26); recording (4/3–4/5, 4/13, 4/17–4/18, 4/20–4/21, 5/24–5/26)
 Jane Lurie – recording (1/5–1/6, 1/15–1/16, 2/25–2/27, 4/6–4/7)
 Joni Mitchell – producer; recording (1/1–1/4, 1/7–1/9)
 Tony Miller – recording (4/19)
 Patrick Milligan – mixing (1/1–1/4, 1/7–1/13, 4/17–4/18, 5/24–5/26); producer (all tracks)
 Michael Nemo – recording (2/24)
 Thomas Root – recording (1/16–1/18)
 Dave Zefferett – recording (4/22–4/23)

Design
 Joel Bernstein – photography; research
 Cameron Crowe – interviewer; liner notes
 Lisa Glines – art direction; design
 Joni Mitchell – illustration; interviewee
 Doran Tyson – product manager

Charts

Blue Highlights

A condensed version of Joni Mitchell Archives – Vol. 2: The Reprise Years (1968–1971), titled Blue Highlights, was released on April 23, 2022, by Rhino Records. The sampler album was released exclusively as a vinyl LP for Record Store Day 2022, and was made with "Joni’s insight, cooperation and creative input". Blue Highlights is the ninth overall release and fourth auxiliary release of the Joni Mitchell Archives, and like the album its material is derived from, features a track listing that is in chronological order. The vinyl release is limited to 9,000 copies in the United States and 16,000 copies worldwide. It debuted at number 150 on the Billboard 200, making it the first release from the archive series to appear on the chart.

Track listing

Charts

References

Joni Mitchell compilation albums
2021 compilation albums
Rhino Entertainment compilation albums